Australian National may refer to:

Australian National Airways airline in Australia from 1936 until 1957
Australian National Botanic Gardens in Canberra
Australian National Maritime Museum in Sydney
Australian National Railways Commission railway operator in Australia from 1975 until 1987
Australian National University in Canberra